Michael W. Punke (born December 7, 1964) is an American author, attorney, academic, and policy analyst. He is a former Deputy United States Trade Representative and U.S. Ambassador to the World Trade Organization in Geneva, Switzerland. In 2017, he became vice president for public policy at Amazon Web Services. 

As an author, Punke is best known for writing The Revenant: A Novel of Revenge (2002), which was adapted into film as The Revenant (2015), directed by Alejandro González Iñárritu, with a screenplay by Iñárritu and Mark L. Smith, and starring Leonardo DiCaprio and Tom Hardy.

Early life and education
Punke was born and raised in Torrington, Wyoming, the son of Marilyn and Butch Punke, a high school biology teacher. He has a younger brother, Tim, and a sister, Amy. They engaged in various outdoor activities in the wilderness like fishing, hunting, hiking, shooting, and mountain biking. When he was a teenager, he also spent at least three summers working at the Fort Laramie National Historic Site as a "living history interpreter." He was also a debate team champion in high school, which he graduated early from to attend the University of Massachusetts Amherst, later transferring to George Washington University, where he graduated with a degree in International Affairs from the Elliott School of International Affairs. He later attended and received his Juris Doctor degree from Cornell Law School, where he focused on trade law, and was elected to become editor-in-chief of the Cornell International Law Journal.

Career
Upon graduation from Cornell Law in the 90s, Punke worked as a government staffer for Senator Max Baucus (D-Montana), who was later ambassador to China. Specifically, from 1991–92, Punke served as international trade counsel to Baucus, who was also then chairman of the Senate Finance Committee's International Trade Subcommittee. Punke also met his wife Traci while working for Baucus. During 1993–95, Punke then served at the White House as director for international economic affairs and was jointly appointed to the National Economic Council and the National Security Council.

Work at the Office of the United States Trade Representative
In 1995–96, Punke became a Senior Policy Advisor at the Office of the United States Trade Representative (the USTR), where he advised them on issues ranging from intellectual property (IP) law to trade to agricultural law. Punke has also worked on international trade issues from the private sector, including as a partner at the Washington, D.C., office of Mayer, Brown, Rowe, & Maw. From 2003 to 2009, Punke consulted on public policy issues out of Missoula, Montana.

In 2009, President Barack Obama selected Punke to serve as the Deputy United States Trade Representative and U.S. Ambassador and Permanent Representative to the World Trade Organization (WTO) in Geneva, Switzerland. Obama's selection of Punke for this position was also confirmed by the U.S. Senate in 2011.

Private sector work
Punke has been a partner at the law firm of Mayer Brown, resident in the Washington, D.C. office and working on various matters involving international trade law. In the years of 2003 to 2009, Punke served as a consultant on various public policy matters and was also based in Missoula, Montana. In February 2017, Punke joined Amazon Web Services as Vice President for Global Public Policy.

Writing

The Revenant: A Novel of Revenge
Punke is the author of The Revenant: A Novel of Revenge, which was published by Carroll & Graf in 2002.

Punke allegedly came up with the idea to write the novel while on an airplane, after reading a couple of lines in a history book about real-life frontier fur trapper Hugh Glass. Punke was also working at the law firm of Mayer Brown at the time when he started the book (1997), so he would go to the office as early as 5:00 AM before anyone else got there to write pages for roughly three hours, and then do his job for eight to ten hours. The book took a total of four years to complete and according to his brother Tim, Punke actually caught pneumonia at least four times during the writing process. Punke also performed extensive research on Glass, which included setting up and testing real hunting traps. The book was published in 2002 to little fanfare, although Punke was able to sell movie rights to it. Once he discovered the novel, Director Alejandro G. Iñárritu fought for it to be made into a movie, where other directors such as Park Chan-Wook and producers such as Megan Ellison were also attached.

After Punke relocated with his wife Traci and their two children to Missoula, Montana, where he worked part-time as a policy consultant and an adjunct professor at the University of Montana, he finished two screenplays as well as two non-fiction books, one about the fight to save the Buffalo – Last Stand (2007) – and the other about a mining disaster that occurred in North Butte, Montana – Fire and Brimstone: The North Butte Mining Disaster of 1917 (2013).

During his time as ambassador to the WTO, Punke was permitted to receive royalties from sales of his books, though he was prohibited from promoting them in any way, due to ethics policies preventing federal officials from self-enrichment. As his tenure coincided with the 2015 release of the film adaptation of The Revenant, he did not attend any public or promotional events related to the film. Instead, family members represented and spoke for him during that time.

Fire and Brimstone: The North Butte Mining Disaster of 1917
In 2006, Punke published a non-fiction book, via Hachette Books, that covered a mining disaster that occurred in North Butte, Montana during 1917. The book was a finalist for the Mountains and Plains Booksellers Award. A reprint edition was also published in 2007. The book has received favorable reviews from Publishers Weekly, Booklist, Kirkus Reviews and other sources.

Last Stand
HarperCollins published Punke's non-fiction book about saving the Buffalo – Last Stand – in 2007.  The subtitle of the book is "George Bird Grinnell, the Battle to Save the Buffalo, and the Birth of the New West."

Other writing work
Punke also wrote the introduction to a contemporary reprint of Mari Sandoz's 1954 book, The Buffalo Hunters: The Story of the Hide Men.

Punke was also the historical correspondent for Montana Quarterly magazine.

Bibliography

Fiction
The Revenant: A Novel of Revenge (2002)
Ridgeline (2021)

Non-fiction
Fire and Brimstone: The North Butte Mining Disaster of 1917 (2006), 
Last Stand (2007)

References

External links

Michael Punke at Harper Collins
Michael Punke's Books at GoodReads
Maxim Magazine Profile of Michael Punke
Washington Post Article on Michael Punke

1964 births
20th-century American lawyers
21st-century American lawyers
21st-century American male writers
21st-century American non-fiction writers
21st-century American novelists
American Western (genre) novelists
American diplomats
American male non-fiction writers
American male novelists
Cornell Law School alumni
Elliott School of International Affairs alumni
Living people
Montana Democrats
Montana lawyers
Permanent Representatives to the World Trade Organization
Recess appointments
Writers from Missoula, Montana
Obama administration personnel